Windsor is a historic market town and unparished area in the Royal Borough of Windsor and Maidenhead in Berkshire, England. It is the site of Windsor Castle, one of the official residences of the British monarch. It is immediately south of the River Thames, which forms its boundary with its smaller, ancient twin town of Eton.

Etymology
Windlesora is first mentioned in the Anglo-Saxon Chronicle. (The settlement had an earlier name but this is unknown.) The name originates from old English Windles-ore or winch by the riverside. By 1110, meetings of the Great Council, which had previously taken place at Windlesora, were noted as taking place at the castle, referred to as New Windsor. By the late 12th century the settlement at Windelsora had been renamed Old Windsor.

History

Medieval period
The early history of the site is unknown, although it was almost certainly settled some years before 1070 when William the Conqueror had a timber motte-and-bailey castle constructed. From about the 8th century, high status people as well as the royalty began visiting the site. From the 11th century the site's link with King Edward the Confessor is documented. In the later medieval period, royal use of the site increased, probably because it offered good access to woodlands and opportunities for hunting – a sport which also developed military skills.

Plantagenet period
The settlement at Old Windsor largely transferred to New Windsor during the 12th century, although substantial planning and setting out of the new town (including the parish church, marketplace, bridge, hermitage and leper hospital) did not take place until , under Henry II, following the civil war of Stephen's reign. At about the same time, the castle was rebuilt in stone. Windsor Bridge is the earliest bridge on the Thames between Staines and Reading, built at a time when bridge building was rare; it was first documented in 1191 but had probably been built, according to the Pipe rolls, in 1173. It played an important part in the national road system, linking London with Reading and Winchester. By directing traffic into the new town, it underpinned the success of New Windsor's fledgling economy.

The town was the site of the Treaty of Windsor in the year 1175, following the Normans invasion of Ireland. The treaty was between Henry II and Ruadhrí Ua Conchobhair, High King of Ireland. The treaty involved agreements regarding the two kings' respective spheres of influence on the island of Ireland, control over their subjects, and the paying of tribute to Henry. Despite the agreement, the treaty would collapse and conflict in Ireland would continue for several centuries.

The town of New Windsor, as an ancient demesne of the Crown, was a privileged settlement from the start, apparently having the rights of a free borough, for which other towns had to pay substantial fees to the king. It had a merchant guild (known by the 14th century as the Fraternity or brotherhood of the Holy Trinity) from the early 13th century and, under royal patronage, was made the chief town of the county in 1277, as part of its grant of royal borough status by Edward I's charter. Somewhat unusually, this charter gave no new rights or privileges to Windsor but probably codified the rights which it had enjoyed for many years.

Windsor's position as chief town of Berkshire was short-lived, however, as people found it difficult to reach. Wallingford took over this position in the early 14th century. As a self-governing town Windsor enjoyed a number of freedoms unavailable to other towns, including the right to hold its own borough court, the right of membership (or 'freedom') and some financial independence. The town accounts of the 16th century survive in part, although most of the once substantial borough archive dating back to the 12th century was destroyed, probably in the late 17th century.

New Windsor was a nationally significant town in the Middle Ages, certainly one of the fifty wealthiest towns in the country by 1332. Its prosperity came from its close association with the royal household. The repeated investment in the castle brought London merchants (goldsmiths, vintners, spicers and mercers) to the town in the late 13th century and provided much employment for townsmen. The development of the castle under Edward III, between 1350 and 1368, was the largest secular building project in England of the Middle Ages, and many Windsor people worked on this project, again bringing great wealth to the town. Although the Black Death in 1348 had reduced some towns' populations by up to 50%, in Windsor the building projects of Edward III brought money to the town, and possibly its population doubled: this was a 'boom' time for the local economy. People came to the town from every part of the country, and from continental Europe. The poet Geoffrey Chaucer held the honorific post of Clerk of the Works at Windsor Castle in 1391.

The development of the castle continued in the late 15th century with the rebuilding of St George's Chapel. With this Windsor became a major pilgrimage destination, particularly for Londoners. Pilgrims came to touch the royal shrine of the murdered Henry VI, the fragment of the True Cross and other important relics. Visits to the chapel were probably combined with a visit to the important nearby Marian shrine and college at Eton, founded by Henry VI in 1440, and dedicated to the Assumption; which is now better known as Eton College. Pilgrims came with substantial sums to spend. From perhaps two or three named inns in the late 15th century, some 30 can be identified a century later. The town again grew in wealth. For London pilgrims, Windsor was probably – but briefly – of greater importance than Canterbury and the shrine of that city's patron saint Thomas Becket.

Tudor and Stuart periods
With the closures of the Reformation, however, Windsor's pilgrims traffic died out, and the town began to stagnate about ten years afterwards. The castle was considered old-fashioned and shrines to the dead were thought to be superstitious. The early modern period formed a stark contrast to the medieval history of the town. Henry VIII was buried in St George's Chapel in 1547, next to Jane Seymour, the mother of his only legitimate son, Edward (Edward VI). Henry, the founder of the Church of England, may have wanted to benefit from the stream of pilgrims coming to the town. His will gives that impression.

Most accounts of Windsor in the 16th and 17th centuries talk of its poverty, badly made streets and poor housing. Shakespeare's play The Merry Wives of Windsor is set in Windsor and contains many references to parts of the town and the surrounding countryside. Shakespeare must have walked the town's streets, near the castle and river Thames, much as people still do. The play may have been written in the Garter Inn, opposite the Castle, but this was destroyed by fire in the late 17th century. The long-standing – and famous – courtesan of king Charles II, Nell Gwyn, was given a house on St Albans Street: Burford House (now part of the Royal Mews). Her residence in this house, as far as it is possible to tell, was brief. Only one of her letters addressed from Burford House survives: it was probably intended as a legacy for her illegitimate son, the Earl of Burford, later the Duke of St Albans.

Windsor was garrisoned by Colonel Venn during the English Civil War. Later it became the home of the New Model Army when Venn had left the castle in 1645. Despite its royal dependence, like many commercial centres, Windsor was a Parliamentarian town. Charles I was buried without ceremony in St George's Chapel after his execution at Whitehall in 1649. The present Guildhall, built in 1680–91, replaced an earlier market house that had been built on the same site around 1580, as well as the old guildhall, which faced the castle and had been built around 1350. The contraction in the number of old public buildings speaks of a town 'clearing the decks', ready for a renewed period of prosperity with Charles II's return to the Castle.

But his successors did not use the place, and as the town was short of money, the planned new civic buildings did not appear. The town continued in poverty until the mid 19th century. In 1652 the largest house in Windsor Great Park was built on land which Oliver Cromwell had appropriated from the Crown. Now known as Cumberland Lodge after the Duke of Cumberland's residence there in the mid-18th century, the house was variously known as Byfield House, New Lodge, Ranger's Lodge, Windsor Lodge and Great Lodge.

Georgian and Victorian periods
In 1778, there was a resumption of the royal presence, with George III at the Queen's Lodge and, from 1804, at the castle. This started a period of new development in Windsor, with the building of two army barracks. However the associated large numbers of soldiers led to a major prostitution problem by 1830, in a town where the number of streets had little changed since 1530. In the 18th century the town traded with London selling the Windsor Chair which was actually made in Buckinghamshire.

A number of fine houses were built in this period, including Hadleigh House on Sheet Street, which was built in 1793 by the then mayor of Windsor, William Thomas. In 1811 it was the home of John O'Reilly, the apothecary-surgeon to George III. Windsor Castle was the westernmost sighting-point for the Anglo-French Survey (1784–1790), which measured the precise distance between the Royal Greenwich Observatory and the Paris Observatory by trigonometry. Windsor was used because of its relative proximity to the base-line of the survey at Hounslow Heath.

The substantial redevelopment of the castle in the subsequent decade and Queen Victoria's residence from 1840, as well as the coming of two railways in 1849, signalled the most dramatic changes in the town's history. These events catapulted the town from a sleepy medieval has-been to the centre of empire – many European crowned heads of state came to Windsor to visit the Queen throughout the rest of the 19th century. Unfortunately, excessive redevelopment and 'refurbishment' of Windsor's medieval fabric at this time resulted in widespread destruction of the old town, including the demolition of the old parish church of St John the Baptist in 1820. The original had been built around 1135.

Later periods
Most of the current town's streets date from the mid to late 19th century. However the main street, Peascod Street is very ancient, predating the castle by many years, and probably of Anglo-Saxon origin. It formed part of the 10th-century parish structure in east Berkshire and is first referred to as Peascroftstret in c. 1170. The 1,000-year-old royal castle, although the largest and longest-occupied in Europe, is a recent development in comparison. "New Windsor" was officially renamed "Windsor" in 1974.

Religion
The original parish church of Windsor is dedicated to St John the Baptist and is situated adjacent to the High Street. The church is said to have dated from the time that King Henry I moved the Royal Court from Old Windsor to 'New Windsor'. The church was clearly established by the time of Henry II in about 1110, as there are references to it by then. In 1543, Henry Filmer, Robert Testwood and Anthony Pearson, the three Windsor Martyrs, were burnt at the stake in Deanery Gardens, near the church. The original church building had Saxon arches and Norman work and by the 18th century it was described as 'a vast building with 10 side altars and several chantries' and perhaps eight gabled roofs. There was a small spire on top of the main central tower.

In 1818 the high cost of repairs to the old building led to plans for a complete rebuild at a cost of £14,000. Charles Hollis was appointed architect and the new building was erected between 1820 and 1822 with cast iron columns that were floated down the Thames. The ribs that support the roof are also cast iron. The new church, Gothic in style with a pinnacle tower containing the bells, was officially consecrated by the Bishop of Salisbury on 22 June 1822. Samuel Sanders Teulon added the chancel and the apse in 1880. The chancel screen was added in 1898 to mark the 60-year reign of Queen Victoria. In 1906 the Hunter organ was installed. The north side gallery was reduced in length to make way for the organ.

The more recent church of All Saints' is situated on Frances Road. The incumbent vicar is the Revd Canon Sally Lodge. The author Thomas Hardy trained as an architect and joined Arthur Blomfield's practice as assistant architect in April 1862. Between 1862 and 1864 he worked with Blomfield on All Saints'. A reredos, possibly designed by Hardy, was discovered behind panelling at All Saints' in August 2016.

Tourism
As a result of the castle, Windsor is a popular tourist destination and has facilities usually found in larger towns: two railway stations, a theatre and several substantial hotels. Various boat trips operate on the River Thames, with connections to Maidenhead and Staines-upon-Thames. In winter, Alexandra Gardens hosts a temporary ice rink. Near the town is Legoland Windsor, the only Legoland park in the United Kingdom and the largest Legoland park in the world in terms of area. Legoland Windsor was built on the site of the former Windsor Safari Park.

Shopping
As a tourist town there are many gift shops around the castle, and there are shops and restaurants in Windsor Royal Station inside Windsor & Eton Central railway station. The main shopping street is Peascod Street.

Transport 
Windsor has two railway stations. Windsor & Eton Central railway station is the southern terminus of the Slough–Windsor & Eton line. A Great Western Railway shuttle to Slough connects with services to London Paddington and Reading. Windsor & Eton Riverside station is the terminus for South Western Railway direct services from London Waterloo. Both stations were built at around the same time in the 19th century, as the two train companies which owned the lines both wanted to carry Queen Victoria to Windsor, with the first line opened gaining the privilege. From 1883 to 1885, London's District Railway's westbound service from ran as far as Windsor.

Bus services in the town are provided by Thames Valley Buses, First Berkshire & The Thames Valley and Reading Buses. There are frequent bus services between Windsor and Heathrow Airport, Green Line Coach Station in Central London, and Legoland Windsor Resort. Windsor has a large central coach park with 74 spaces to cater mostly for the large tourist groups coming to visit Windsor Castle and town. It is accessed by pedestrians via a footbridge adjacent to Windsor & Eton Central railway station. Windsor is linked to the town of Eton (on the opposite bank of the River Thames) by Windsor Bridge. Originally a fully trafficked road bridge, Windsor Bridge is now for pedestrians and cyclists only. To the south of the town lies Windsor Great Park and the towns of Old Windsor, Egham and Virginia Water. Windsor lies on National Cycle Route 4 (London–Fishguard). The main access roads serving the town have adjacent cycle paths or nearby alternative traffic-free cycle routes.

Windsor has links to three local motorways:
 the M3 (junction 3),  to the south via the A332, passing Ascot;
 the M4 (junction 6),  to the north via the A332, with the A355 spur leading to Slough;
 the M25 (junction 13),  to the east via the A308, which continues to Staines-upon-Thames.

Sport
Windsor's senior football team is Windsor F.C. The team currently play in the Combined Counties Football League and their home ground is Stag Meadow, granted to the original club by King George V in 1911. The club's most recent president was the former commentator Barry Davies. Windsor Cricket Club's clubhouse and pitches are at Home Park (public) in the shadow of Windsor Castle. The club played host to a 2006 Lord's Taverners cricket match. The Windsor 1st team currently play in Division 2A of the Thames Valley League. Neighbours Windsor Rugby Club also use the ground and the team currently plays in the Southern Counties North division. Several other local sports clubs are based at Home Park (public), including hockey and archery clubs, and the Datchet Dashers running club. Royal Windsor Rollergirls were one of the first roller derby leagues to be founded in the UK in 2007, they regularly hold games at Windsor Leisure Centre.

Education

State schools 
State-funded schooling in the town is provided by a system of three-tier schooling. Schools are controlled by either the local authority or academy trusts. The town is served by eleven first schools for children up to 9 years old, and three middle schools until age 13:

 Dedworth Middle School
 St Edward's Royal Free Ecumenical Middle School
 Trevelyan Middle School

Pupils aged 13–18 are provided for at the town's two single-sex secondary schools:
 The Windsor Boys' School
 Windsor Girls' School

Independent schools 
Several independent schools operate in the town, including:

St George's School, Windsor Castle

Politics

Windsor is part of the Royal Borough of Windsor and Maidenhead which is administered by an elected unitary authority. The mayor is Cllr John Story. The current Member of Parliament for the Windsor constituency (which includes the surrounding small towns and villages, such as Eton and Datchet) is Adam Afriyie (Conservative), who was first elected at the 2005 General Election. Afriyie is notable for being the first black Conservative Member of Parliament in the House of Commons. In 2012 the council reintroduced the role of town crier to the borough. The previous town crier had retired in 1892 and for 120 years the post remained vacant.

In 2018 the belongings of homeless people were controversially removed and stored for reasons of security. A bus intended to shelter the Windsor homeless was impounded by police.

Twin towns
Windsor is twinned with:

 Goslar, Lower Saxony, Germany (since 1969)
 Neuilly-sur-Seine, Hauts-de-Seine, France (since 1955)

Notable residents
Windsor has had many notable residents.
 King Charles III and other British royal family members
 Bruce Anstey, New Zealand motorcycle racer; previously lived in Windsor
 Sir Dhunjibhoy Bomanji, shipping magnate, socialite and philanthropist lived in Windsor
 Zinzan Brooke, New Zealand rugby union international; formerly played amateur rugby for Windsor Rugby Football Club
 Sir Michael Caine, actor; lived at the Old Mill House, Clewer
 Sir Sydney Camm, designer of the World War II fighter aircraft the Hawker Hurricane, lived at 10 Alma Road; a memorial in the form of a replica Hawker Hurricane is displayed near Alexandra Gardens, on the Thames Promenade
 Billy Connolly, comedian; lived in Windsor for several years in the 1990s
 Elizabeth Counsell, actress; born in Windsor
Richard Fairbrass and Fred Fairbrass, singers from Right said Fred live in Windsor
 Ranulph Fiennes, adventurer, explorer and author; born in Windsor
 Dhani Harrison, musician and son of George Harrison; born in Windsor
 James Haskell, former England Rugby Union player; born in Windsor
 Natalie Imbruglia, Australian pop singer; owns a house in the Clewer village area of Windsor
 Norman Lovett, stand-up comedian and actor best known, as an actor, for playing Holly, the ship's computer, in the TV series Red Dwarf; born in Windsor
 Hubert Stanley Middleton, organist and Cambridge University don; born in Windsor
 Margaret Oliphant, 19th century novelist and historical writer; lived at Clarence Crescent
Peter Osgood, Chelsea and England footballer; born and resided for many years in Windsor
Jeremy Kyle, television presenter, lives in Windsor
 Jimmy Page, musician, lived at the Old Mill House at the end of Mill Lane, Windsor 1980-2004
 Billy Smart Jr., circus co-owner; lived in St. Leonard's mansion in the heart of Windsor Safari Park, where he entertained celebrated persons from Princess Margaret to The Beatles; he sold his St. Leonard's Hill guest house to comedian Freddie Starr; and later lived in Ascot Place, which is now apartments and has a plaque and statue dedicated to him
 Jim Swire, doctor best known for his involvement in the aftermath of the 1988 bombing of Pan Am Flight 103
 Hugh Thomas, historian; born in Windsor
 H.G. Wells, author; lived and worked in Windsor in 1880

Notes and references

External links
 

 

 
Towns in Berkshire
Populated places on the River Thames
Royal Borough of Windsor and Maidenhead
Unparished areas in Berkshire
Former civil parishes in Berkshire